Andrew Paul Albert is an American country music singer and songwriter from Roswell, Georgia, United States. His songwriting repertoire includes writing for artists such as Blake Shelton, Dustin Lynch, and Carrie Underwood.

Albert grew up in Roswell and moved to Nashville, Tennessee, in 2011. He signed a publishing deal with Downtown Music in 2014. Prior to moving to Nashville he was in the pop-rock band Holiday Parade from 2004 to 2011 and Bonaventure in 2011 with Dan Smyers.

Selected writing discography
2015
 Devin Dawson – “Blind Man” (Neon Cross) (writer)
2016
 Blake Shelton - "She's Got A Way With Words" (writer) *single
 Granger Smith - "If the Boot Fits" (writer) *single
 Nick Fradiani - "All On You" (writer) *single
 Chris Lane - "All About You" (writer)
 Dylan Schneider - "Want You Back"
 Kris Allen – “Letting You In” (Dogbear Records) (writer)
 'Nashville’ (TV show) soundtrack – “From Here On Out” (writer)
 Walker McGuire – “Mama’s Kitchen Table”
2017
 Steve Moakler - "School" (writer)
 Granger Smith - "Happens Like That" "Still Holds Up" "Stutter" "Never Too Old" (writer)
 Petric - "Play It Safe" (writer)
 Shawn Austin - "Paradise Found" (writer)
 Mitchell Tenpenny - "Truck I Drove In High School" "Mixed Drinks" "Laid Back" "If The Boot Fits" (writer)
 Dustin Lynch - "State Lines" (writer)
 Chris Lane - "One Girl" (writer)
 Brett Kissel - "Between You And Me" (writer)
2018
 Aaron Pritchett - "Worth a Shot" (writer)
 Dustin Lynch - "Good Girl" (writer)
 Carrie Underwood - "The Bullet" (writer)
 Jordan Rager - "Georgia Boy" (writer)
 Hardy - "Rednecker" (writer)
 Devin Dawson - "Dark Horse" (writer)
 Walker McGuire - "18 Forever" (writer)
 Hunter Hayes - "This Girl" (writer)
 Dan + Shay - "Island Time" (writer)
 Mitchell Tenpenny - "All On You" (writer)
 Mitchell Tenpenny - "Goner" (writer)
 John King - "Ride Forever" (writer)
 Chris Bandi - "Rain Man" (writer)
 Matt Lang - "Love Me Some You" (writer)
2019
 Wilder Woods - "Sure Ain't" (writer)
 Granger Smith - "Holler" "Heaven Bound Balloons" (writer)
 Cassadee Pope - "I've Been Good" (writer)
2020
 Dustin Lynch - "Thinking 'Bout You (Featuring Lauren Alaina)" (writer)
 Dan + Shay - "Take Me Home For Christmas" (writer)
 Dan + Shay - "Christmas Isn't Christmas" (writer)

References

People from Roswell, Georgia
American country singer-songwriters
American country rock singers
American male singer-songwriters
Living people
Year of birth missing (living people)
Musicians from Georgia (U.S. state)
Country musicians from Georgia (U.S. state)
Singer-songwriters from Georgia (U.S. state)